Robert McQueen High School is a public secondary school in Reno, Nevada, United States. It is part of the Washoe County School District.

History
The school was named for Dr. Robert McQueen, emeritus professor of psychology at the University of Nevada, Reno.  During his tenure from 1955 to 1991, Dr. McQueen headed UNR's scholarship program, served as department chair and dean, and was appointed to Nevada's first psychological board of examiners.  Dr. McQueen served on the Washoe County School District Board of Trustees from 1969 to 1990, during which the district built several new schools, including Reed and McQueen .  He also negotiated the purchase of McQueen's  site from the Bureau of Land Management for just one dollar.

When the school opened in 1982, adjoining Seventh Street and Robb Drive were only dirt roads extended out to allow access to the school.  Some remarked the school was "in the middle of nowhere" as it was more than a mile from other buildings.  Since then, the construction of numerous subdevelopments has resulted in overcrowding problems.  The building was designed for an enrollment of 1,600; in 2009/10 more than 1,800 were enrolled. In order to mitigate overcrowding concerns and comply with local fire regulations, several modular classrooms have been added to the campus.

In 2010, Newsweek listed McQueen as the 740th best high school in the United States using the ratio of number of AP exams taken to graduating students as its criterion.

In March 2018, student Noah Christiansen called the office of U.S. Representative Mark Amodei to argue in favor of banning bump stocks and raising the minimum age to buy a gun. A staffer who worked for Amodei called Robert McQueen High School for his use of the word "fuck", which led to Christiansen's suspension. On March 19, the American Civil Liberties Union sent a letter to the school district demanding that the suspension be overturned. On March 23, the school district decided to withdraw the suspension to avoid "expensive and protracted litigation", but stood by the school's action to punish the student.

Extracurricular activities

Athletics
The Lancers compete in the High Desert League, which is part of the Northern Nevada 4A Region.  McQueen competes in the 4A level, which is the large school category. In 2008, rivals.com named them the 75th Best High School Football Team in the nation. They beat Palo Verde High School in a rematch of the 2001 state semi-final game on December 6, 2008, with a score of 13-12 for the Nevada 4A High School Football Championship.  They finished ranked 48th in the nation by Rivals.com.
 Nevada Interscholastic Activities Association State Championships 
Basketball (Girls) - 1996, 1997, 1998, 1999
Football - 1990, 1992, 1997, 2000, 2002, 2008, 2010
Soccer (Girls) - 2003
Softball - 2005, 2006
Swimming (Girls) - 1995
Track and Field (Boys) - 2010, 2014
Track and Field (Girls) - 2010
Cross Country (Boys) - 2014, 2015

Music
MARCHING BAND
Current Director: Nathan Williams

The marching band has won the state championships fifteen times: (1986, 1987, 1988, 1995, 1996, 1998, 2002, 2003, 2005, 2007, 2008, 2009, 2010, 2011, 2017, 2019)

The band has played in the following parades:
 Hollywood Christmas Parade, Los Angeles, CA (2012, 2003)
 Graeagle July 4 Parade (2018 [First Place], 2012, 2010, 2009, 2008)
 Reno Rodeo Parade (2018, 2017, 2012, 2010, 2009 [First Place], 2008 [First Place], 2007 [First Place])
 Fiesta Bowl Parade, Phoenix, AZ (2010/11 Class B National Champion; Field Show, Fourth Place in the Nation; 2006 Class B National Champion Field Show, Fifth Place in the Nation; 2018 Field show and Parade, Second Place Field Show and First Place Field Conductor)
 Tournament of Roses Parade, Pasadena, CA (2014, 2009) 
 American Legion National Convention, Non-Competitive (2007)
 Presidential Inaugural Parade, Washington, DC (2005)

CHOIR
Current Director: Brandon Pierce
The Robert McQueen High School Choir performed in Carnegie Hall in 2007, June 2009, and March 2019.
McQueen's Core Jazz vocal ensemble won the "Best in Nevada" award at the UNR Jazz Festival in 2005.
McQueen's Core Jazz choir also had a concert tour of 5 cities in China for the World Choir Games, held in Shaoxing, China, July 2010.

ORCHESTRA
Current Director: Kenny Baker
The McQueen Orchestra with Kenny Baker has played at the ASTA National Conference in 2010 in Santa Clara, California

Publications
The Excalibur — monthly school newspaper, inducted into the National Scholastic Press Association's Hall of Fame in the fall of 2004, making it the only student publication in the state to be inducted. It won a NSPA Newspaper Pacemaker in 2009.
"McQueen TV" — closed circuit television station (daily broadcast news show) and video production facility
Chrysalis — annual literary magazine
Caxton — yearbook, awarded the national Silver Crown award in 2006 and the NSPA Yearbook Pacemaker in 2008.

Demographics
In 2009, the school's total enrollment was 1,884, and its ethnic makeup was:
American Indian/Alaskan Native 39 (2.1%)
Asian/Pacific Islander 231 (12.3%)
Hispanic 262 (13.9%)
Black 79 (4.2%)
White 1,273 (67.6%)

Notable alumni
1985, Terri Ivens, actress
1986, Michael Landsberry, teacher and military veteran killed during the 2013 Sparks Middle School shooting 
1987, Mädchen Amick, actress, Alice Cooper on Riverdale (2017 TV series)
1989, David Byerman, Director of the Kentucky General Assembly
1989, Nicole King, molecular biologist, professor and MacArthur Fellowship winner
1995, Carol Roth, Professional Cheerleader for the Oakland Raiderettes.
1996, Teresa Benitez, former Miss Nevada 2002 and politician
1997, Chris Aguila, former baseball outfielder, played with the New York Mets
1998, April Meservy, singer and songwriter
2001, Ryan Bader, professional MMA fighter, won The Ultimate Fighter: Team Nogueira vs. Team Mir, was competing in the UFC's Light Heavyweight Division, currently the Light Heavyweight Champion of Bellator MMA
2001, Chris Carr, football defensive back, played for Oakland Raiders, Tennessee Titans, Baltimore Ravens, Minnesota Vikings, San Diego Chargers & New Orleans Saints before retiring in March 2014
2002, Jeff Rowe, football quarterback, played for Cincinnati Bengals, Seattle Seahawks & New England Patriots
2002, Ryan Thomas, wrestler; current professional mixed martial arts fighter for American Top Team
2003, Clint Stitser, football kicker, played for New York Jets, Seattle Seahawks, Cincinnati Bengals & Washington Redskins in the NFL; played for the Las Vegas Locomotives in the United Football League (2009–2012)
2009, Kyle Van Noy, football linebacker
2018, Brandon Aiyuk, football wide receiver

References

15. http://www.wolfpackradio.org/category/hiphop/Chikezie

External links

Official site
School marching band
Football boosters site
Class of 1985 site

Educational institutions established in 1982
High schools in Reno, Nevada
Washoe County School District
Public high schools in Nevada
School buildings completed in 1982
1982 establishments in Nevada